Highland is an unincorporated community in Middleville Township, Wright County, Minnesota, United States.  The community is located along Wright County Road 7 near 20th Street SW.

Nearby places include Howard Lake, Waverly, Rassat, Maple Lake, and Buffalo.

References

Unincorporated communities in Minnesota
Unincorporated communities in Wright County, Minnesota